Luis Marín may refer to:

 Luis Marin (conquistador) (1499–1547), Spanish conquistador
 Luis Marín (footballer, born 1906), Spanish football player
 Luis Muñoz Marín (1898–1980), journalist, politician, statesman and first elected governor of Puerto Rico
 Luis Marín (footballer, born 1974), retired Costa Rican footballer and currently manager
 Luis Marín (footballer, born 1983), Chilean football goalkeeper
 Luis Marín (artist) (born 1948), Cuban artist